"Somebody's Daughter" is a song co-written and recorded by Canadian country music artist Tenille Townes. Released as a single after signing a deal with Columbia Nashville, it was her first radio single in five years and first to be promoted in the United States.  The song is the first single from her third studio album The Lemonade Stand.

Content
Townes wrote the song with Barry Dean and Luke Laird, and was inspired by a drive Townes took with her mother where she saw a homeless girl holding a cardboard sign on a street corner that led to a conversation contemplating her backstory.

The song won the 2019 Canadian Country Music Association Awards for Single, Song, and Video of the Year, in addition to Townes winning for Female Artist of the Year.

Chart performance
"Somebody's Daughter" was Townes' first chart single in her native Canada where it reached number 92 on the Canadian Hot 100 and was a Number One hit on the Canadian Country chart dated February 2, 2019. It also made the top 30 of both the Billboard Hot Country Songs and Country Airplay charts.

Weekly charts

Year-end charts

Certifications and sales

References

2018 singles
2018 songs
Tenille Townes songs
Songs written by Tenille Townes
Songs written by Luke Laird
Songs written by Barry Dean (songwriter)
Song recordings produced by Jay Joyce
Columbia Nashville Records singles
Canadian Country Music Association Single of the Year singles